is a 2010 Japanese suspense mystery film directed by . The film is the second instalment in the film series based on the television series AIBOU: Tokyo Detective Duo, being preceded by the 2008 film AIBOU: The Movie and followed by the 2013 film AIBOU: The Movie III. The film was released on December 23, 2010.

Cast
Yutaka Mizutani
Mitsuhiro Oikawa
Kazuhisa Kawahara

Seiji Rokkaku as Mamoru Yonezawa

Reception
The film was number-one at the Japanese box office for three consecutive weekends in both 2010 and 2011 and grossed .

References

External links

2010s Japanese films
2010s mystery films
Films based on television series
Japanese mystery films
Tokyo Metropolitan Police Department in fiction
Films scored by Yoshihiro Ike
Toei Company films